Rogers Township may refer to:

 Rogers Township, Sebastian County, Arkansas, in Sebastian County, Arkansas
 Rogers Township, Ford County, Illinois
 Rogers Township, Presque Isle County, Michigan
 Rogers Township, Cass County, Minnesota
 Rogers Township, Barnes County, North Dakota

Township name disambiguation pages